Dichelopa phalaranthes is a species of moth of the family Tortricidae. It is found on the Marquesas Archipelago in French Polynesia.

Subspecies
Dichelopa phalaranthes phalaranthes (Marquesas Archipelago: Hiva Oa)
Dichelopa phalaranthes aporrhegma Clarke, 1986 (Marquesas Archipelago: Nuku Hiva)

References

Moths described in 1934
Dichelopa